Red Nose is a Canadian romantic comedy film, directed by Érik Canuel and released in 2003. Starring Patrick Huard as Félix Legendre, an acerbic literary critic, and Michèle-Barbara Pelletier as Céline Bourgeois, a writer whose most recent work he harshly trashed, the film traces their journey from hate at first sight to falling in love when they are unexpectedly assigned as each other's partners while volunteering for Quebec's annual Opération Nez rouge Christmas driving service.

The film's cast also includes Pierre Lebeau, Jacques Godin, Christian Bégin, Caroline Dhavernas, Sylvain Marcel, Stéphane Breton and Dany Laferrière.

Claudette Casavant received a Prix Jutra nomination for Best Makeup, at the 6th Jutra Awards, for her work on the film.

References

External links
 

2003 films
Canadian romantic comedy films
Canadian Christmas films
Films shot in Montreal
Films set in Montreal
Films directed by Érik Canuel
French-language Canadian films
2000s Canadian films